This is a list of regions and or districts of ancient Armenia.

Aghdznik

Artsakh

Ayrarat

Gugark

Korchayk

Mok

Nor Shirakan

Paytakaran

Sophene

Syunik

Tayk

Turuberan

Upper Armenia

Utik

Vaspurakan

See also

 Armenian Mesopotamia
 Lesser Armenia
 Commagene

References

 
Regions
Armenia